Brain vesicles are the bulge-like features of the early development of the neural tube in vertebrates.  Vesicle formation begins shortly after anterior neural tube closure at about embryonic day 9.0 in the mouse and the fourth and fifth gestational week in human development.  In zebrafish and chicken embryos, brain vesicles form by about 24 hours and 48 hours post-conception, respectively.  Initially there are three primary brain vesicles: prosencephalon, mesencephalon, and rhombencephalon.  These develop into five secondary brain vesicles – the prosencephalon is subdivided into the telencephalon and diencephalon, and the rhombencephalon into the metencephalon and myelencephalon. During these early vesicle stages, the walls of the neural tube contain neural stem cells in a region called the neuroepithelium or ventricular zone.  These neural stem cells divide rapidly, driving growth of the early brain, but later, these stem cells begin to generate neurons through the process of neurogenesis.

See also 
 Neural stem cell
 Stem cell
 Radial glial cell
 Neurogenesis
 Cellular differentiation

References

Embryology of nervous system